The Clásica Memorial Txuma was a road bicycle race held annually in Spain. It was organized as a 1.2 event on the UCI Europe Tour.

Winners

References

UCI Europe Tour races
1995 establishments in Spain
2007 disestablishments in Spain
Recurring sporting events established in 1995
Recurring sporting events disestablished in 2007
Cycle races in Spain
Defunct cycling races in Spain